Liene Jansone (born 22 May 1981, in Riga) is a Latvian women's basketball player who has most recently played for the Tarsus Belediyesi of the Turkish Women's Basketball League and is member of the Latvian national team.

Both of her parents were basketball coaches and her younger sister, Līga, is a former basketball player. Jansone started playing at a professional level in 1997, in the local TTT/Rīga team.

She was a member of the Siena Saints NCAA team from 2000 until 2004. Jansone eventually became one of the team's leaders. In her first year, the team won NCAA Conference. Jansone was named the Most Valuable Player. Since then, she has played in Europe.

Jansone is a member of the Latvian national team. Prior to playing at a senior level, she played at the under-18 and under-20 levels. She made her senior debut on 6 August 2005. Jansone has represented Latvia at several Eurobasket Women (2005, 2007, 2009, 2011) and at the 2008 Summer Olympics.

Siena statistics 
Source

References

External links
Profile at FIBA Europe page

1981 births
Living people
Basketball players at the 2008 Summer Olympics
Latvian expatriate basketball people in the United States
Latvian women's basketball players
Olympic basketball players of Latvia
Siena Saints women's basketball players
Basketball players from Riga
Tarbes Gespe Bigorre players
Power forwards (basketball)